Toadie may refer to:

 Toadfish Rebecchi, a long-running character in the Australian soap opera, Neighbours
 In Australian usage, the smooth toadfish, common toadfish, and related fish species
 Toadwart, a cartoon character from Disney's Adventures of the Gummi Bears
 Toadies, an alternative rock band from Fort Worth, Texas

See also 
 Toad
 Frog and Toad